Casey Wittenberg (born November 30, 1984) is an American professional golfer who had a successful amateur career.

Wittenberg was born in Memphis, Tennessee. He played collegiately at Oklahoma State University. He lost to Nick Flanagan in the finals of the 2003 U.S. Amateur.

In 2004, he finished 13th at the Masters Tournament, the lowest amateur finish in 41 years. He was the only player in the field to improve his score each round. Additionally, he registered the lowest Sunday back 9 score (31) of any amateur in Masters history.

At the 2004 U.S. Open at Shinnecock Hills, he shot a four round total of 296, which was the second best of any amateur in the tournament that year.

Wittenberg turned professional in 2004 and played on the PGA Tour, Web.com Tour (formerly Nationwide Tour), and mini-tours since. In 2012, Wittenberg won his first title on a major golf tour, the Nationwide Tour's Chitimacha Louisiana Open. He followed it up three months later with his second win of the season at the Preferred Health Systems Wichita Open, one week after finishing T10 at the U.S. Open.

Wittenberg was the leading money winner on the Web.com Tour in 2012, earning his 2013 PGA Tour card, and was named Web.com Tour Player of the Year. In 2013, he made only eight cut in 27 tournaments and finished 150th on the money list and 164th on the FedEx Cup points list, resulting in the loss of his PGA Tour card.

Wittenberg returned to the Web.com Tour in 2014 and has played there since. He won again in 2017 at the Chitimacha Louisiana Open, but he finished the regular season points in 41st and once again failed to earn his PGA Tour card.

Amateur wins (4)
this list may be incomplete
2001 Azalea Invitational
2003 Southern Amateur, Porter Cup, Terra Cotta Invitational

Professional wins (6)

Web.com Tour wins (3)

Web.com Tour playoff record (0–1)

NGA Hooters Tour wins (3)
2006 Pearl River Resort Golf Classic
2007 Kandy Waters Memorial Classic, Flora Bama Lounge Classic

Results in major championships

LA = Low amateur
CUT = missed the half-way cut
"T" indicates a tie for a place

Results in The Players Championship

"T" indicates a tie for a place

U.S. national team appearances
Amateur
Junior Ryder Cup: 2002
Walker Cup: 2003

See also
2008 Nationwide Tour graduates
2012 Web.com Tour graduates

References

External links

Results and statistics on the NGA Hooters Tour's official site

American male golfers
Oklahoma State Cowboys golfers
PGA Tour golfers
Korn Ferry Tour graduates
Golfers from Memphis, Tennessee
1984 births
Living people